Greer Barnes (born 1964) is an American stand-up comedian and actor.  He is known for clever wordplay, observational humor, sketch comedy, mimicry, and energetic physical comedy.  He has performed in comedy festivals, in commercials, on television and in films. He regularly appears at The Comedy Cellar in New York City’s West Village.

Biography
Barnes was born in the South Bronx and grew up on Manhattan's West Side.  He has a Jewish stepfather and was bar mitzvahed at thirteen.  He was a star athlete in high school, especially in baseball.  At 19, he was invited to try out with the San Francisco Giants, but was unable to afford to make the trip.  He went into stand-up comedy and was soon well known in the New York scene.  His comic idols were Richard Pryor and Eddie Murphy.  He has appeared at Catch a Rising Star, Comic Strip Live, The Comedy Cellar, and Carolines on Broadway.

In 2014 he released his debut comedy album See What I'm Saying.

He has performed at the Aspen, Montreal, Melbourne, and Edinburgh Comedy Festivals.  Friend and fellow comedian, Dave Chappelle has taken Barnes along as his opening act on international tours. Greer has also performed at the world famous Madison Square Garden numerous times while opening for Louis CK.

Barnes has appeared frequently on TV.  He appeared on Late Night with David Letterman in July 1995 and on Late Night with Stephen Colbert in 2017. He has been seen on MTV, BET, HBO, and most other major networks. In February 2009, he wrote and starred in a half-hour special on Comedy Central Presents.

He has been featured in commercials for the National Basketball Association and the National Football League.  In 1999 his background in sports led to his feature film debut when he appeared in For Love of the Game, a baseball film starring Kevin Costner.

Barnes currently lives in Brooklyn.

Filmography
 1999 For Love of the Game
 2014 Top Five
 2016 The Comedian
 2019 Joker

Television
 Late Show with David Letterman
 Chappelle's Show
 In Living Color
 Late Show with Stephen Colbert
 Def Comedy Jam
 Comedy Central Presents
 Last Call with Carson Daly
 Comedy Central's Premium Blend 
 The Jim Gaffigan Show
 Red Oaks
 Kevin Can Wait
 Crashing

Web series
 Horace and Pete

References

External links
 

21st-century American male actors
African-American male comedians
American male comedians
American stand-up comedians
American sketch comedians
Entertainers from the Bronx
African-American Jews
1964 births
Living people
21st-century American comedians
People from the Upper West Side
People from Brooklyn
21st-century African-American people
20th-century African-American people